Ponta do Barril is a headland in the western part of the island of São Nicolau, Cape Verde. It is about 8 km northwest of Tarrafal de São Nicolau and 5 km southwest of the nearest village Praia Branca.

Lighthouse

The lighthouse at the Ponta do Barril was built in 1891. It is a white 9 m high quadrangular tower. Its focal height is 13 m.

See also
List of lighthouses in Cape Verde

References

External links
Photo at Light Photos

Headlands of Cape Verde
Geography of São Nicolau, Cape Verde
Tarrafal de São Nicolau
Ponta do Barril